The Moskalyev SAM-25 was an early 1940s Soviet, military assault transport, the last of a series of developments of the successful Moskalyev SAM-5.

Design and development
The single engine, high wing Moskalyev SAM-5bis-2 was a 1934 light transport developed into four more different types, of which the SAM-25 was the last. Apart from having a more powerful engine, it was an updated and refined version of the original.

It had the same high-set, wooden, two spar, cantilever wing as the SAM-5bis-2, with ply-skin ahead of the forward spar forming a torsion resistant box. The whole surface, including the ply-skinned leading edge, was fabric covered. The SAM-25's wings introduced drooping ailerons, slotted automatic slotted flaps and automatic slats.

It was powered by a nose-mounted  Shvetsov M-11F five cylinder, radial engine, installed with its cylinders largely exposed for cooling. As in the earlier versions, the fuselage had a wooden girder structure. The pilot's enclosed cockpit was ahead of the wing leading edge and the cabin was behind him under the wing. Its port side had a central entry door with one window ahead of it and entry door/stretcher hatch/photography window aft. Behind the cabin the fuselage narrowed to the SAM-5bis-2-style tail, with a blunted triangular fin and more rounded rudder, though the latter was now fuller, with trim tabs. A blunted triangular plan tailplane was mounted on top of the fuselage and carried rounded, tabbed elevators, separated for rudder movement.

Like the SAM-14, the SAM-25 had fixed, wide-splayed cantilever landing gear, each side with a landing leg and drag strut within a common fairing.

Operational history
It was evaluated from mid 1943. There has been some debate about production: later post-war evidence suggests there were no wartime machines but there was post-war series production from 1946 for Aeroflot.

Specifications

References

Single-engined tractor aircraft
High-wing aircraft
1940s Soviet military utility aircraft
Moskalyev aircraft